Raj Vadgama is an ultramarathon runner from Mumbai, India

Career
Badwater Ultramarathon, running  in  44 hours 37 minutes 39 seconds

References

1967 births
Living people
Indian male marathon runners
Indian ultramarathon runners
Indian male long-distance runners
Male ultramarathon runners
Athletes from Gujarat